Paul Ekollo(born 1 December 1984) is a Cameroonian footballer.

External links
Goal.com
 

Cameroonian footballers
Expatriate footballers in Thailand
Living people
1984 births
Paul Ekollo
Association football forwards